Abdul Matin Chaudhary (1925–1989), also known by his daak naam Kola Mia, and the epithet Jinnar Daan Haat (lit. Jinnah's right hand), was a Pakistani Bengali politician, journalist and a member of the 1st National Assembly of Pakistan as a representative of East Bengal. He was also Pakistan's inaugural Minister of Agriculture.

Early life and education
Chaudhary was born on 13 February 1895 to a Bengali Muslim family in the village of Bhadeshwar in Golapganj, Sylhet District. His father, Abdul Karim Chaudhary, was a sub-inspector and his mother's name was Habibunnesa Khatun. He completed his secondary education at the Sylhet Government High School where he gained a first class in 1912. He then proceeded to study at the Murari Chand College where he completed his intermediate examinations in 1914. In 1916, Chaudhary graduated from the Aligarh Muslim University in North India. He also completed his Bachelor of Laws from Ripon College in Calcutta in 1919.

Political career 
Chaudhary served as a Minister for two terms in the Bengal provincial government during British Rule. He contributed to the establishment of the Assam Provincial Muslim League in 1937, and served as Commerce Minister at the Assam Legislative Assembly under Muhammed Saadulah. Between 1945 and 1947, he was a member of the All-India Muslim League's working committee. In 1947, he became a member of the 1st National Assembly of Pakistan and the country's first Minister of Agriculture. He was also a chief advisor to Abdul Hamid Khan Bhashani, a longtime member of the Aligarh University Court and a member of Pakistan's first Pay Commission.

Journalism
Chaudhary founded the Bengali weekly magazine Jugbheri in 1932. He also published an English weekly magazine titled "The Eastern Herald" in 1939. Other than that, he was an editor of The Mohammadi and a long-time assistant editor of the Daily Forward newspaper. He worked in the editing board of the Bombay Chronicle from 1926 to 1927.

Death
Chaudhary died on 28 December 1948. He was buried in the historic Mewa Shah Graveyard in Karachi.

References

Assam MLAs 1937–1946
Pakistani MNAs 1947–1954
1895 births
1948 deaths
Aligarh Muslim University alumni
Burials at Mewa Shah Graveyard
People from Golapganj Upazila
Murari Chand College alumni
Surendranath Law College alumni
Members of the Constituent Assembly of Pakistan